Susan Elizabeth Doerr (born January 13, 1945) is an American former competition swimmer and world record-holder.  She represented the United States as a 15-year-old at the 1960 Summer Olympics in Rome, where she swam for the gold medal-winning U.S. team in the preliminary round of the 4×100-meter freestyle relay.  She did not receive a medal, because only relay swimmers who competed in the event final were eligible under the 1960 Olympic rules.

Doerr began her career in age group swimming in Philadelphia.  She competed in her first United States Women's National Championships in the spring of 1959, representing Vesper Boat Club.  She went on to be a leading member of Vesper when they clinched their first high point award at the 1961 United States Women's National Championships; the same year, Doerr set a world record in the 100 m butterfly.

Doerr graduated from Abington Friends School in Abington, Pennsylvania in 1963, and from the University of Pennsylvania in 1967.

References

1945 births
Living people
American female butterfly swimmers
American female freestyle swimmers
World record setters in swimming
Olympic swimmers of the United States
People from Bryn Mawr, Pennsylvania
Swimmers at the 1960 Summer Olympics
21st-century American women